= Wolf's isotopic response =

Dermatological sign

Wolf's isotopic response is a dermatological sign that is characterized by the appearance of a new dermatosis or cutaneous infection at the site of a previous unrelated and already healed dermatosis ("isotopic" means identical location).
